This is a list of rides, attractions and themes from the Cedar Point amusement park that no longer exist in the park.

Defunct roller coasters

Defunct rides

Defunct attractions

Former shows

Rides relocated within Cedar Point

References

External links
 Cedar Point Timeline at CedarPoint.com
 Cedar Point History at The Point Online

Lists of former amusement park attractions